Jon Krick (born November 24, 1972) is a former American football player who played four seasons with the Albany Firebirds of the Arena Football League. He played college football at Purdue.

College career
Krick played for the Purdue Boilermakers, recording 89 tackles, 53 assists and 15 tackles for losses. A two-year captain, he was All-Big Ten honorable mention from 1994 to 1996. He overcame a season-ending injury in 1992 to return a year later but was diagnosed with diabetes. Krick started all but two games in his final three seasons with the Boilermakers.

Professional career
Krick played for the Albany Firebirds from 1997 to 2002, earning Second Team All-Arena honors in 1999 and was named the AFL's Most Inspirational Player of the Year in 2000.

References

External links
Just Sports Stats

Living people
1974 births
American football fullbacks
American football linebackers
Purdue Boilermakers football players
Albany Firebirds players
Indiana Firebirds players